Xu Anxiang (born April 1956) is a lieutenant general (zhong jiang) of the Chinese People's Liberation Army Air Force (PLAAF). He has served as commander of the Guangzhou Military Region Air Force and deputy commander of the Guangzhou MR since 2013.

Career
Xu Anxiang was born in April 1956 in Changzhou, Jiangsu Province.

In 2002 Xu was commander of the 14th Fighter Division, a unit on constant combat duty in the Nanjing War Zone. In 2007 he was frontline commander for PLAAF fighters deployed to the Sino-Russian joint military exercise Peace Mission 2007. It was a notable appointment as the PLAAF top leadership always selects the most competent commanders to command transnational military missions. This was the first time that PLAAF aircraft had entered a foreign country for combat drills. Xu directed 24 sorties of eight Chinese J-7s and Il-76s within a short period of time. His division achieved its tactical objectives, even though in a strange location, against unfamiliar targets, and under uncertain circumstances.

In 2008, Xu was deputy chief of the staff of the Nanjing Military Region Air Force when the Great Sichuan earthquake occurred. He was put in charge of the Nanjing MR air force units in the search and rescue operation. He personally oversaw preparation of aircraft in the Special Rescue Regiment that received emergency mobilization orders at 10:30 p.m. on the night of the earthquake, departing 3 hours later with all necessary materials. He was later promoted to chief of staff of the Nanjing MRAF. He was promoted to commander of the Guangzhou Military Region Air Force and concurrently deputy commander of the Guangzhou MR in 2013, replacing Zhang Jianping, who had become deputy commander of the PLAAF. Xu was elevated to the rank of lieutenant general on 16 July 2014.

References

Living people
People's Liberation Army Air Force generals
1956 births
People's Liberation Army generals from Jiangsu
People from Changzhou
Members of the 19th Central Committee of the Chinese Communist Party